The Rashtriya Samajwadi Party- Secular is a political party in India. The RSP-Secular is led by party president Sandhya  Singh

References

Political parties in India